Augusto Caesar Amonsot (born August 30, 1985), more commonly known as Czar Amonsot, is a Filipino professional boxer. He challenged once for the WBO interim world title in 2007.

Boxing career

Early career
On January 18, 2004, at the Gaisano Country Mall in Cebu City, Philippines, Amonsot made his professional debut. He won by technical knockout against Rey Lomoljo in the fifth round of their scheduled six-round fight.

On May 29, 2004, after accumulating an undefeated record of 5 wins, 5 KOs, Amonsot made his international debut when he fought in unfamiliar territory in Uijeongbu, South Korea against Kim-Jung Park. Impressively, Amonsot knocked out the latter in the second round of their scheduled eight-round fight.

After going back to the Philippines after his win against Park, Amonsot gained two more wins in his record. The first being against Nolasco Dan, the first opponent of Amonsot to survive the distance, and the other being the then Indonesian Featherweight Champion Leed Shabu, whom Amonsot stopped in the sixth round.

Amonsot's next four fights were held in foreign territory, in the RCTI Studio in Jakarta, Indonesia. His first fight in the country was rather disappointing, with Amonsot suffering his first loss as a pro, losing by TKO to Simson Butar-Butar during the fifth round. His next fight wasn't a win either, but a draw against Joey De Ricardo after ten rounds. Finally, in the third fight of his four-fight campaign in Indonesia, Amonsot finally got back to his winning ways, registering a TKO win against Syamsul Hidayat in the fourth round. And in a rematch, Amonsot, in his final fight in Indonesia, defeated Leed Shabu once again, this time winning by a unanimous decision after ten rounds.

After registering two wins, a draw, and his first loss as a pro in Indonesia, Amonsot came back to the Philippines to defeat Jun Paderna and Richard Cabillo. He later went on to defeat the then undefeated WBO Asia Pacific Super Featherweight Champion Victor Mausul of Indonesia to earn his first regional belt.

On February 3, 2006, in The Orleans Hotel and Casino in Las Vegas, Nevada, Amonsot made his U.S. debut against Cristian Favela of Mexico. After eight rounds of action, Amonsot was awarded the victory, winning the bout by unanimous decision.

Amonsot won his next three fights after the win over Favela, beating the likes of Decho Kokietgym, Jose Reyes, and Silverio Ortiz, accumulating a record of 17-1-1 with 10 victories coming by way of knockout.

Rematch with Butar-Butar
On September 23, 2006, Amonsot fought the same Simson Butar-Butar who gave him his first loss just about a year and a half ago, but this time, Amonsot had the home court advantage, the fight being held in his hometown of Tagbilaran City, Bohol. The fight was to be fought for Amonsot's WBO Asia Pacific Super Featherweight belt, but due to Amonsot's failure to make weight during the weigh-in, weighing-in at a notorious five pounds over the limit, only Butar-Butar had the privilege to fight for the title.

Amonsot, to the dismay of the crowd, was embarrassed in front of his hometown fans, losing in just 47-seconds into the first round of the bout. Amonsot was caught flush by a right hook from Butar-Butar, sending him down. He tried to get up, but was counted out after he went down again, obviously disorientated from the punch that caught him right on the chin.

Fight with Michael Katsidis
The fight that most fans know Amonsot for was his bloody war with Michael Katsidis. On July 21, 2007, Amonsot faced Katsidis for the interim WBO lightweight title at the Mandalay Bay Resort in Las Vegas, Nevada. Amonsot lost a 12-round unanimous decision in a violent, back and forth struggle with the Australian Katsidis. He suffered a brain bleed in that fight which many observers assumed would mark the end of his professional career. As of 2017, however, he continues to fight.

Professional Boxing Record

References

External links

1985 births
Living people
Super-featherweight boxers
Lightweight boxers
People from Tagbilaran
Boxers from Bohol
Southpaw boxers
Filipino male boxers